Pablo Martín Alonso (10 July 1896 – 11 February 1964) was a Spanish general who served as Minister of the Army of Spain between 1962 and 1964, during the Francoist dictatorship.

References

1896 births
1964 deaths
Defence ministers of Spain
Government ministers during the Francoist dictatorship